One Law for the Woman is a 1924 American silent Western film directed by Dell Henderson and starring Cullen Landis, Mildred Harris and Cecil Spooner.

Cast
 Cullen Landis as Ben Martin 
 Mildred Harris as Polly Barnes 
 Cecil Spooner as Phillis Dair 
 Stanton Heck as Brennan 
 Otis Harlan as Judge Blake 
 Bertram Grassby as Bartlett 
 Charlotte Stevens as Nellie

References

Bibliography
 Munden, Kenneth White. The American Film Institute Catalog of Motion Pictures Produced in the United States, Part 1. University of California Press, 1997.

External links
 

1924 films
1924 Western (genre) films
Films directed by Dell Henderson
American black-and-white films
Vitagraph Studios films
Silent American Western (genre) films
1920s English-language films
1920s American films